David J. Rudolph (born 1967) is an American scholar and Director of Messianic Jewish Studies at The King's University, who has written books and articles on the New Testament, Second Temple Judaism, Messianic Jews, intermarriage, and Jewish-Christian relations. His work A Jew to the Jews: Jewish Contours of Pauline Flexibility in 1 Corinthians 9:19-23 won the 2007 Franz Delitzsch Prize from the Freie Theologische Akademie.  Rudolph is also a lecturer in New Testament at Messianic Jewish Theological Institute’s School of Jewish Studies and a fellow at the MJTI Center for Jewish-Christian Relations.

Life and career
David Rudolph (Ph.D., Cambridge University) was born and raised in the greater Washington, D.C. area.  After receiving M.A. degrees in Old Testament and Biblical Languages from Gordon-Conwell Theological Seminary in South Hamilton, Massachusetts (1999–2002), Rudolph completed a Ph.D. in New Testament at the University of Cambridge under the supervision of Markus Bockmuehl (2002–2007). He went on to serve as director of the School of Jewish Studies at the Messianic Jewish Theological Institute in Los Angeles and scholar-in-residence at the MJTI Center for Jewish-Christian Relations (2008–2011). In 2015 he became Director of Messianic Jewish Studies at The King's University.

Rudolph's work A Jew to the Jews: Jewish Contours of Pauline Flexibility in 1 Corinthians 9:19-23 won the 2007 Franz Delitzsch Prize from the Freie Theologische Akademie in Germany.  A review by Robert S. Dutch in the Journal for the Study of the New Testament described the book "a must-read for reconsidering Paul as a Torah-observant Jew and his relationship with Gentiles." J. Brian Tucker's review in the Journal of Beliefs and Values described the book as "a seminal work among New Testament scholars engaged in post-supersessionist interpretation."  A review by Jacob Fronczak in Messiah Journal described the book as "one of only a few scholarly contributions by practicing Messianic Jews to the ongoing Jewish/Christian dialogue on Paul."

He served as the rabbi of Shulchan Adonai Messianic Synagogue in Annapolis, Maryland from 1990-1996. He was the rabbi of Tikvat Israel Messianic Synagogue in Richmond, Virginia from 2011-2015. Currently Rudolph is Professor of New Testament and Jewish Studies at The King’s University. Rudolph is also a lecturer in New Testament at the MJTI School of Jewish Studies. As a scholar of Jewish-Christian relations, he has also advocated for the inclusion of Messianic Jews in Jewish-Christian dialogue.

Awards 
 Franz Delitzsch Prize (2011) from the Freie Theologische Akademie in Germany for A Jew to the Jews: Jewish Contours of Pauline Flexibility in 1 Corinthians 9:19-23.

Selected bibliography

Books
 New Testament Interpretation After Supersessionism: Changing Paradigms. Co-authored with Joel Willitts, Justin Hardin and J. Brian Tucker. Eugene: Cascade, forthcoming.
 The Jewish New Testament: An Introduction to its Jewish Social & Conceptual Context. Co-authored with Joel Willitts and Justin Hardin. Grand Rapids: Eerdmans, forthcoming.
 Introduction to Messianic Judaism: Its Ecclesial Context and Biblical Foundations. Edited by David Rudolph and Joel Willitts. Grand Rapids: Zondervan, 2013.  
 A Jew to the Jews: Jewish Contours of Pauline Flexibility in 1 Corinthians 9:19-23. Tübingen: Mohr Siebeck, 2011. 
 Growing Your Olive Tree Marriage: A Guide for Couples from Two Traditions. Baltimore: Lederer, 2003. 
 The Voice of the Lord: Messianic Jewish Daily Devotional. Baltimore: Lederer, 1998.

Articles
 "Paul's 'Rule in All the Churches' (1 Cor 7:17-24) and Torah-Defined Ecclesiological Variegation." Studies in Christian-Jewish Relations 5 (2010): 1-23.
 "History of Judeo-Christian Communities in the Jewish Diaspora." Pages 136-39 in Encyclopedia of the Jewish Diaspora: Origins, Experiences, and Culture. 1. Edited by M. Avrum Ehrlich. Santa Barbara: ABC-CLIO, 2008. 
 "Messianic Jews and Christian Theology: Restoring an Historical Voice to the Contemporary Discussion." Pro Ecclesia 14:1 (2005): 58-84.
 "Festivals in Genesis 1:14." Tyndale Bulletin 54:2 (2003): 23-40.
 "Jesus and the Food Laws: A Reassessment of Mark 7:19b." Evangelical Quarterly 74:4 (2002): 291-311.

References

External links
 MJStudies, Rudolph's gateway to post-supersessionist New Testament scholarship
 MessianicJudaism.net, Rudolph's platform for mainstream Messianic Jewish media on the internet
 4 Enoch, Rudolph's contributor page at 4 Enoch, the Online Encyclopedia of Second Temple Judaism and Christian Origins
 MessianicGentiles.com, Rudolph's website providing resources for non-Jews who practice Messianic Judaism

1967 births
Living people
Messianic Jews